Bharatham is a 1991 Indian Malayalam-language musical drama film written by A. K. Lohithadas and directed by Sibi Malayil. It stars Mohanlal, Urvashi, Nedumudi Venu, Lakshmi, and Murali. The film was produced by Mohanlal through his production house Pranavam Arts. The film features original songs composed by Raveendran and a background score by Johnson. Bharatham is interpreted as a modern-day adaptation of the Ramayana from Bharatha's perspective. How, in the absence of his elder brother, Gopinathan takes the responsibility of the family and hides his griefs is the core of the story.

The film was a critical and commercial success, running for 125 days in theatres. Bharatham is also noted for its music that is largely Carnatic classical and semi-classical. The film won three National Film Awards—Best Actor for Mohanlal, Best Male Playback Singer for K. J. Yesudas for the song "Rama Katha Ganalayam", and Special Mention for Raveendran's music, and five Kerala State Film Awards. On the centenary of Indian cinema in 2013, Forbes India included Mohanlal's performance in the film on its list of "25 Greatest Acting Performances of Indian Cinema". It was remade in Tamil as Seenu by P. Vasu in 2000.

Plot 

Kalloor Gopinathan alias Gopi is a member of a happy family with carnatic music heritage and he himself is a good singer. Kalloor Ramanathan who is also an excellent singer, is Gopi's elder brother, guru and role model. Ramanathan is married to Ramani and has a son Appu. Gopi is in love with Devi who is the sister of Ramani. Raman reigns in the family and in the society with his music. But he turns into alcoholism. Despite several attempts by family members to make him give up the habit and several failed assurances to his family members, he is unable to give up the habit.

Raman reaches for a concert in an inebriated state and Gopi is forced to take over. He is an instant hit with the masses. This has been depicted quite symbolically during the song Sree Vinayagam. Gopi's music, which was hidden behind his brother's charisma now flows out in full strength. Taking this as an insult, Raman starts hating his brother and strives hard to recover from alcoholism. His morale is shattered when organizers of the Tyagaraja Aaradhana select his brother over him to perform. This makes Raman angry. So Gopi decides to stop singing. But on hearing this Raman understands his mistake and asks Gopi to sing at Tyagaraja Aaradhana.

Ramanathan attends his brother's concert in a drunken state but is able to appreciate his brother's talent. In the middle of the concert, he enters the stage, removes his ancestral necklace and puts it on Gopi as a mark of continuation of his legacy. He then walks away into the horizon. With a longing to get rid of the alcoholism and perform a concert with his brother, he sets on a pilgrimage, but was never to return. Gopi, learning that Raman died in an accident, is forced to conceal the truth because of their vocally disabled sister's marriage. Gopi gets lot of moral support with Devi, who also knows the truth. Gopi's trauma reaches penultimate when his family learns of Raman's death and that Gopi was concealing it. Everything ends fine when the family understands his intentions. The movie ends while Gopi begins to train Appu in their musical legacy.

Cast

Mohanlal as Kalloor "Gopi" Gopinathan
Nedumudi Venu as Kalloor "Raman" Ramanathan
Urvashi as Devi
Lakshmi as Ramani 
Murali as Harikumar
Vineeth Kumar as Appu
Suchitra Murali as Radha
Kaviyoor Ponnamma as Devaki
Oduvil Unnikrishnan as Unnimama
K. P. A. C. Lalitha as Madhavi
Thikkurissy Sukumaran Nair as Grandfather
Kunjan as Kuttan
Bobby Kottarakkara as Kunjunni
Lalu Alex as Vijayan
M. S. Thripunithura as Janardhanan Nair
Subair
Biyon as Young Gopinathan

Soundtrack

The film score was composed by Johnson while the acclaimed songs were composed by Raveendran with lyrics were penned by Kaithapram. All the songs of this movie were instant hits.

Awards 
39th National Film Awards
 Best Actor - Mohanlal
 Best Male Playback Singer - Dr. K. J. Yesudas for Ramakadha Gaanalayam
 Special Mention - Raveendran

Kerala State Film Awards
 Best Actor - Mohanlal
 Second Best Film - Mohanlal (as producer)
 Best Actress - Urvashi
 Best Music Director - Raveendran
 Special Jury Award - Nedumudi Venu

Filmfare Awards South
 Best Director (Malayalam) - Siby Malayil
 Best Music Director (Malayalam) - Raveendran

Kerala Film Critics Award

 Best Actor - Mohanlal
 Best Screenplay - A. K. Lohithadas
 Best Music Director - Raveendran
 Best Cinematography - Anandakuttan

References

External links
 

1991 films
1990s musical drama films
1990s Malayalam-language films
Films scored by Raveendran
Films featuring a Best Actor National Award-winning performance
Malayalam films remade in other languages
Pranavam Arts International films
Films directed by Sibi Malayil
Films with screenplays by A. K. Lohithadas
Indian musical drama films
Films about classical music and musicians
1991 drama films